Circaeaster agrestis is a flowering plant species and one of only one to two species in its family, the Circaeasteraceae. The plant is a small, glabrous herb found in temperate zones from the northwest Himalaya to northwest China.

References

Flora of China: Circaeaster agrestis

Monotypic Ranunculales genera
Flora of Asia
Ranunculales